Carlos Calderón López (born 14 April 1995) is a Spanish footballer who plays as a winger for Logroñés.

Club career
Born in Almansa, Albacete, Castile-La Mancha, Calderón was a Levante UD youth graduate. He made his senior debut with the reserves on 27 April 2014, coming on as a second-half substitute for Álvaro Traver in a 0–1 away loss against CF Reus Deportiu in the Segunda División B championship.

On 20 July 2015 Calderón moved to another reserve team, signing a one-year deal with RCD Mallorca B in Tercera División. He scored his first senior goal the following 21 February, netting the last in a 2–0 away win against CF Sant Rafael.

On 29 July 2016 Calderón joined Getafe CF, being initially assigned to the B-team also in the fourth level. After scoring 13 goals for the side, he signed a new two-year contract.

On 21 October 2017 Calderón made his first team – and La Liga – debut, coming on as a late substitute for Amath Ndiaye in a 1–1 away draw against Levante UD. The following 10 July, he signed a three-year deal with Segunda División side CD Lugo, but was loaned to Internacional de Madrid on 31 August.

On 2 September 2019, Calderón terminated his contract with the Galicians, and signed for third division side CD Tudelano the following 31 January.

References

External links

1995 births
Living people
People from Almansa
Sportspeople from the Province of Albacete
Spanish footballers
Footballers from Castilla–La Mancha
Association football wingers
La Liga players
Segunda División B players
Tercera División players
Atlético Levante UD players
RCD Mallorca B players
Getafe CF B players
Getafe CF footballers
CD Lugo players
Internacional de Madrid players
CD Tudelano footballers
SD Logroñés players